First Congregational Church (also known as Metropolitan Community Church of the Rockies) is a historic church in Denver, Colorado. Its church building was added to the National Register in 1987.

The First Congregational Church of Denver was organized in 1864.  After several moves and expansion, the church determined in 1905 that it needed to construct a new building, and purchased four lots at 10th Avenue and Clarkson Street
for $5,000.  The sanctuary was built in 1907 and a fellowship hall wing was completed in 1910.

The sanctuary is essentially cubical and has a three-story corner bell tower. It was designed by Robert S. Roeschlaub Roeschlaub & Son in what its National Registration nomination terms "Lombardic Revival" style, i.e. its design was inspired by 7th and 8th century Italian Lombard style.

The property also includes a 1912 parsonage built in foursquare style.

References

Churches in Denver
Churches on the National Register of Historic Places in Colorado
Churches completed in 1907
National Register of Historic Places in Denver